Barriga is a surname. Notable people with the surname include:

Cecilia Barriga (born 1957), Chilean film director
Enrique Soro Barriga (1884–1954), Chilean composer
Gonzalo Barriga (born 1984), Chilean footballer
José Miguel Barriga Castro (1816–1886), Chilean lawyer and politician
Mark Anthony Barriga (born 1993), Filipino boxer
Rogelio Barriga Rivas (1912–1961), Mexican writer